Laird Sloan (3 October 1935 – 23 June 2017) was a Canadian sprinter. He competed in the men's 400 metres at the 1956 Summer Olympics.  He finished second in the 1954 British Empire and Commonwealth Games 4 x 440 yards relay (with Terry Tobacco, Doug Clement, and Joe Foreman). In the 1954 British Empire and Commonwealth Games Sloan was eliminated in the semi-finals of the 440 yards.

As a student at the University of Michigan, Sloan was a member of Lambda Chi Alpha Fraternity.

References

1935 births
2017 deaths
Athletes (track and field) at the 1956 Summer Olympics
Canadian male sprinters
Olympic track and field athletes of Canada
Athletes (track and field) at the 1954 British Empire and Commonwealth Games
Commonwealth Games silver medallists for Canada
Commonwealth Games medallists in athletics
Sportspeople from Quebec City
Michigan Wolverines men's track and field athletes
Anglophone Quebec people
Medallists at the 1954 British Empire and Commonwealth Games